Mohamed Sibari (1945 – 28 November 2013) was a Moroccan poet, novelist and translator. He wrote books in both Arabic and Spanish.

Sibari was born in Ksar El-Kebir. He was awarded the Spanish National Cross of Merit in 2003, and the Pablo Neruda prize for literature in 2004. In 2010, he won Naji Naaman's Literary Prize in the category of honor awards.

References

External links
 Official website

1945 births
2013 deaths
Moroccan writers
Moroccan writers in Spanish
Moroccan translators
People from Ksar el-Kebir
20th-century translators